Mina Khosravani (Persian: مینا خسروانی; born May 24) known professionally as Mina Kavani (مینا کاوانی), is an Iranian-French actress. She is best known for her role in No Bears (2022), which won the Special Jury Prize at the 79th Venice International Film Festival.

Early life and career 
Mina Kavani was born in Tehran. Brought up into an artistic family, and niece of the well-known film and play director Ali Raffi, she graduated from  Conservatoire Supérieur National d'Art dramatique of Paris (CNSAD).

Fascinated by acting from an early age, she started participating regularly at her uncle's rehearsals at the age of twelve. At sixteen she made her debut in the play It Doesn't Snow in Egypt under the direction of her uncle and on the stage of Tehran's City Theatre, inaugurating her carrier in Iran as an actress in theatre. She soon had pieces such as: Othello (Desdemona), Antigone (Antigone), La Musica and  J'étais dans ma maison et j'attendais que la pluie vienne.

She has collaborated with some of Iran's most crucial film and theatre directors.
At the age of twenty-three, she moved back to Paris and entered the Conservatoire National Supérieur as part of the Jean Damien Barbin's class, during the time in which Daniel Mesguich was the director.

In 2012, she voiced the role of Sahar in the Oscar winning film Argo directed by Ben Affleck.

In the year 2013 she played the protagonist Sara in Sepideh Farsi's film Red Rose. The film was presented international festivals such as the Toronto Film Festival, Festival de Marrakech, and the Chicago film festival. Due to the film containing some nudity, Kavani became the centre of threats made by the by the Iranian media, resulting in her exile. She received her political refugee status with the support of Isabelle Huppert and Bertrand Bonello who had praised her performance in the movie.

In 2014 Kavani performed on the stage of l'Odeon-Theatre de l'Europe, reciting poems by the Iranian contemporary poet Forough Farrokhzad under the direction of Roland Timsit. In 2015 she appeared at Auditorium Orchestre National de Lyon with the notable French actor Jean-Damien Barbin, performing Happy Day Shakespeare.

In the same year she was chosen as one of the juries (next to actress Marisa Berenson) at the Rencontre Cinemathographique de Cannes. Patrick De Carolis was the president of the jury.

In 2015 and 2016 she portrayed the celebrated contemporary Austrian poet Ingeborg Bachmann in the play Malina by Barbara Hutt, during Festival d'Avignon. In 2016 she played Lili in the film Sous Transe by the Moroccan filmmaker Camellia Montassere.

In 2017-18 she appeared in the role of Ipek, on the play Snow an adaption of the novel by Turkish writer Orhan Pamuk (winner of the 2002 Nobel Prize in literature) directed by Blandine Savetier of the National Theatre of Strasburg (TNS). The play was performed all over France and China.

Personal life 
Kavani moved to France in 2010 and acquired French citizenship.

Filmography

Film

Notes

References

External links

Profile at SourehCinema

Living people
People from Tehran
Actresses from Tehran
Iranian film actresses
Iranian stage actresses
Iranian emigrants to France
Iranian diaspora film people
20th-century Iranian actresses
21st-century Iranian actresses
Naturalized citizens of France
Year of birth missing (living people)